Arise Woman! Comedy Jam is a Ugandan stand-up comedy show created and hosted by Akite Agnes. The event happens annually on International Women's Day in celebration of the achievements of the woman in the society and has an all female cast. The show takes place yearly on 8 March. Proceeds from each show go to an identified Charity organisation

Arise Woman!2019 
Arise Woman!2019 is the maiden comedy show of the annual event. Proceeds from this show went to help Home of Hope Uganda (https://www.homeofhopeuganda.org/). The show took place in Theatre Labonita and it comprised an all female star cast.

Performers in Arise Woman!2019 Comedy Jam 

 Akite Agnes (host) 
Fun Factory Ladies 
 Nancy Kobusheshe 
 Maggie Nansubuga
 Leila Kachapizo
 Dora Nakaga
 Rich Mouth
 Flower Girl
 Sheila Katamba

References 

Ugandan stand-up comedians
Ugandan television actresses